Palestinian conflict may refer to:
 Israeli–Palestinian conflict 1947–
 Black September in Jordan 1970–1971 (Jordanian-Palestinian Civil War)
 Lebanese Civil War 1975–1990
 Fatah–Hamas conflict 2005–

See also
Palestinian Civil War (disambiguation)